Manresa is the capital of the Comarca of Bages, located in the geographical centre of Catalonia, Spain, and crossed by the river Cardener. It is an industrial area with textile, metallurgical, and glass industries. The houses of Manresa are arranged around the basilica of Santa Maria de la Seu. Saint Ignatius of Loyola stopped to pray in the town on his way back from Montserrat in 1522. He also read in solitude in a cave near the town for a year, which contributed to the formulation of his Spiritual Exercises. As such, the town is a place of pilgrimage for Catholics.

It is believed the comarcal name "Bages" comes from a corruption of the Latin "Bacchus" due to the extensive production of wine in the area. The wine was produced from grapes grown mainly in terraced vineyards, and many of these old terraces can be seen today. Wine ceased to be the main product of the area as a consequence of phylloxera, but is still a very important part of the Manresa/Bages economy.

During the Napoleonic invasion, the volunteer troops of Manresa (sometent in Catalan language) defeated the French troops in the Bruch Pass (June 1808), but the retreating French burned and demolished much of the town. After the expulsion of Napoleon's troops, Manresans rebuilt the town using the rubble.

History

Influential documents
 Bases propositions included:
 Catalan should be the sole official language in Catalonia
 Public order be under the jurisdiction of the Catalan government exclusively, which should also control finance and taxation
 Catalans only should be eligible for public office in Catalonia
 Military service (from which the upper class could buy exemption) was to be replaced by a volunteer corps
 As prior to 1714, there should be no appeal from decisions of the Catalan high court.
 The Bases also called for the composition of a Catalan Parliament, which was to be elected by 'all heads of family, grouped together in classes based on manual work, technical skill or professional careers and on property, industry and commerce, as far as possible through the corresponding guild organizations'
 The 1408 Liber Manifesti of Manresa is an influential historical document that lets us peer into Renaissance practice of slavery.
 The Liber Manifesti consistently designates slaves as distinct from other servants and provides us with basic but prior elusive figures like the total number of slaves in the town, the proportion of slaves to free people, the percentage of households who owned slaves, the proportion of women and children amongst slaves, and the market value of female, male, and child slaves.

Jewish history

In the 12th century Manresa was said to have contained 500 Jewish families, most of whom lived in a narrow lane called "Grau dels Jueus," near the town hall; their cemetery, still called "Fossana dels Jueus," was outside the city. In the 13th and 14th centuries the Jews there were engaged in manufacturing, trading, money-lending, and in the cultivation of their vineyards and estates.

The hostility of the Christians towards the Jews, which prevailed throughout Catalonia, was also manifested in Manresa. In 1325 the Christian inhabitants of the town tried to prevent the Jews from baking their Passover bread, so that the latter were obliged to appeal to the King for protection. The Jews in Manresa did not escape the general persecution of 1391, and many of them professed to accept Christianity.

After 1414 comparatively few Jews remained in the town, and in 1492 they sold their property for whatever they could get, and left the country. At the beginning of the 15th century Manresa had 30,000 inhabitants; three centuries later it contained barely one-fifth of that number. Several members of the Zabarra (Sabara) family  lived in Manresa. The town is not mentioned in the "Shebeṭ Yehudah."

Climate 
Manresa has a humid subtropical (Köppen Cfa), with cold winters and hot, moderately dry summers, while the rainiest seasons are spring and autumn.

Main sights 

Three bridges cross the Cardener River. The 14th-century basilica of Santa Maria de la Seu stands on a rock above the oldest bridge. La Seu is the principal monument of Manresa. The church we can see today was designed by Berenguer de Montagut who also designed Santa Maria del Mar, Barcelona. The architectural style is characteristic of Catalan Gothic. The work began in 1325, but the church was not finished until the end of the 15th century. The municipal museum is housed in the cloisters of the 17th-century church of Sant Ignasi. This church is part of the Sanctuary Cave of Saint Ignatius (in Catalan Cova de Sant Ignasi), built over a cave in which Saint Ignatius of Loyola is said to have prayed and meditated.

Economy
Industry in the town covers textile-making, metallurgy, and glass manufacture.

Sport
Bàsquet Manresa is a professional basketball club based at the Pavelló Nou Congost. They play in the Spanish Premier Championship which they won once, in 1998.

Major events
The Fira Mediterrania in Manresa is held the first complete weekend in November every year. It is the main meeting point and trade fair of the mediterranean world, folk and roots artists with distributors, organisers, agencies, labels, export offices, instrument makers and dealers, journalists and other professionals.

Manresa Town Hall

The original building dates back to the 19th century.

Remodeling was agreed to be needed due to the old building's impractical use in Modern times. At the end of 2004, a competition was held to remodel the building with the aim of easing its disabled circulation.

The Barcelona-based Add + Arquitectura was selected and the project was completed in 2008. Add partners Manuel Bailo and Rosa Rull were responsible for the design. Bailo and Rull's key move was to partly demolish and extend the rear south-west wall of the town hall in order to implant a new circulation core

The front of the building maintained its traditional structure but at the rear of the building, the elevator and staircase are encased in a "cubist cacoon".

Places borrowing the name
Because of the town's association with St. Ignatius, the novitiate house of the English province of the Jesuits is called Manresa House. Formerly in Roehampton in the London suburbs, it is now in Birmingham.
SEARSOLIN, the extension/outreach research center of Xavier University – Ateneo de Cagayan, is also called the Manresa Farm.
Manresa School takes its name from the town of Manresa, because Saint Candida Maria de Jesus, the foundress of the congregation that runs the school, is influenced by Ignatian spirituality.
Manresa House of Retreats was founded by the Jesuit religious order on the banks of the Mississippi River, midway between Baton Rouge and New Orleans, in Convent, Louisiana. The 130-acre campus hosts three-day preached retreats for men, made in silence, based on the Spiritual Exercises of Saint Ignatius Loyola.
Manresa Island is a 144-acre coastal property in Norwalk, Connecticut, that is the site of a decommissioned coal-fired power plant.

External relations

Twin towns
Sant Joan de Vilatorrada
Sant Vicenç de Castellet

European cooperation
 Manresa is a member city of Eurotowns

Famous people
 Juan Ignacio Cirac Sasturain, Spanish physicist.
 Jordi Lardín, former footballer
 Toni Elías, professional motorcycle racer and inaugural champion of the Moto2 World Championship.
 Manel Fontdevila, a Spanish cartoonist
 Manuel Estiarte, former water polo player
 Joan Ribó, mayor of Valencia
 Pol Freixanet, Spanish footballer
 Berto Romero, humorist.

References

Bibliography
 Panareda Clopés, Josep Maria; Rios Calvet, Jaume; Rabella Vives, Josep Maria (1989). Guia de Catalunya, Barcelona: Caixa de Catalunya.  (Spanish).  (Catalan).
 Chaytor H.J., (1933). A History of Aragon and Catalonia, London: Methuen & CO. LTD. DP125.C5
 Trueta J., (1946). The Spirit of Catalonia, London: Oxford University Press. DP302.C62T7
 Balcells Albert, Walker J. Geoffrey, (1995).  Catalan Nationalism, New York: St. Martin's Press. 
 Roig Sebastiá, (2008). Catalonia, Triangle Postals. 
 
 
 
 
 

Attribution

External links

 
 Official website 
 Manresa tourist 
 Official website of The See basilica 
 Government data pages 
 Manresa House of Retreats website

 
Municipalities in Bages